Lin Ju (born September 1, 1979) is a Dominican table tennis player. Lin was one of the 35 athletes that represented the Dominican Republic at the 2012 Summer Olympics at London, United Kingdom. He defeated the  North Korean Kim Song-Nam 4–3 in the first round, but lost to the Portuguese Marcos Freitas 0–4, ending his chance for a medal in London.

References

Dominican Republic male table tennis players
1979 births
Living people
Olympic table tennis players of the Dominican Republic
Table tennis players at the 2004 Summer Olympics
Table tennis players at the 2008 Summer Olympics
Table tennis players at the 2012 Summer Olympics
Dominican Republic people of Chinese descent
Pan American Games gold medalists for the Dominican Republic
Pan American Games bronze medalists for the Dominican Republic
Pan American Games medalists in table tennis
Central American and Caribbean Games gold medalists for the Dominican Republic
Central American and Caribbean Games silver medalists for the Dominican Republic
Competitors at the 2006 Central American and Caribbean Games
Table tennis players from Fujian
Naturalised table tennis players
Table tennis players at the 2003 Pan American Games
Table tennis players at the 2007 Pan American Games
Table tennis players at the 2011 Pan American Games
Central American and Caribbean Games medalists in table tennis
Medalists at the 2003 Pan American Games
Medalists at the 2007 Pan American Games
Medalists at the 2011 Pan American Games